Enkitta Mothathe may refer to:
 Enkitta Mothathe (1990 film), a Tamil-language romantic action drama film
 Enkitta Mothathe (2017 film), an Indian Tamil-language action drama film